Anthon may refer to:

 Anthon (given name)
 Anthon (surname)
 Anthon, Iowa, US
 Anthon, Isère, a commune of the Isère département, in France

See also
Anthon B Nilsen, Norwegian investment company
 Anthon Berg, Danish chocolatier
 Anthon Transcript, a Mormon document